In music, consonance and dissonance are categorizations of simultaneous or successive sounds. Within the Western tradition, some listeners associate consonance with sweetness, pleasantness, and acceptability, and dissonance with harshness, unpleasantness, or unacceptability, although there is broad acknowledgement that this depends also on familiarity and musical expertise. The terms form a structural dichotomy in which they define each other by mutual exclusion: a consonance is what is not dissonant, and a dissonance is what is not consonant. However, a finer consideration shows that the distinction forms a gradation, from the most consonant to the most dissonant. In casual discourse, as German composer and music theorist Paul Hindemith stressed, "The two concepts have never been completely explained, and for a thousand years the definitions have varied". The term sonance has been proposed to encompass or refer indistinctly to the terms consonance and dissonance.

Definitions

The opposition between consonance and dissonance can be made in different contexts:
In acoustics or psychophysiology, the distinction may be objective. In modern times, it usually is based on the perception of harmonic partials of the sounds considered, to such an extent that the distinction really holds only in the case of harmonic sounds (i.e. sounds with harmonic partials).
In music, even if the opposition often is founded on the preceding, objective distinction, it more often is subjective, conventional, cultural, and style- or period-dependent. Dissonance can then be defined as a combination of sounds that does not belong to the style under consideration; in recent music, what is considered stylistically dissonant may even correspond to what is said to be consonant in the context of acoustics (e.g. a major triad in 20th century atonal music). A major second (e.g. the notes C and D played simultaneously) would be considered dissonant if it occurred in a J.S. Bach prelude from the 1700s; however, the same interval may sound consonant in the context of a Claude Debussy piece from the early 1900s or an atonal contemporary piece.

In both cases, the distinction mainly concerns simultaneous sounds; if successive sounds are considered, their consonance or dissonance depends on the memorial retention of the first sound while the second sound (or pitch) is heard. For this reason, consonance and dissonance have been considered particularly in the case of Western polyphonic music, and the present article is concerned mainly with this case. Most historical definitions of consonance and dissonance since about the 16th century have stressed their pleasant/unpleasant, or agreeable/disagreeable character. This may be justifiable in a psychophysiological context, but much less in a musical context properly speaking: dissonances often play a decisive role in making music pleasant, even in a generally consonant context—which is one of the reasons why the musical definition of consonance/dissonance cannot match the psychophysiologic definition. In addition, the oppositions pleasant/unpleasant or agreeable/disagreeable evidence a confusion between the concepts of "dissonance" and of "noise". (See also Noise in music and Noise music.)

While consonance and dissonance exist only between sounds and therefore necessarily describe intervals (or chords), such as the perfect intervals, which are often viewed as consonant (e.g., the unison and octave), Occidental music theory often considers that, in a dissonant chord, one of the tones alone is in itself deemed to be the dissonance: it is this tone in particular that needs "resolution" through a specific voice leading procedure. For example, in the key of C Major, if F is produced as part of the dominant seventh chord (G7, which consists of the pitches G, B, D and F), it is deemed to be "dissonant" and it normally resolves to E during a cadence, with the G7 chord changing to a C Major chord.

Acoustics and psychoacoustics
Scientific definitions have been variously based on experience, frequency, and both physical and psychological considerations. These include:
Numerical ratios: in Antiquity, these mainly concerned string-length ratios. From the early 17th century onwards, frequency ratios were more often considered. Consonance often is associated with the simplicity of the ratio, i.e. with ratios of lower simple numbers. Many of these definitions do not require exact integer tunings, only approximation.
Fusion: perception of unity or tonal fusion between two notes and/or their partials.
Coincidence of partials: with consonance being a greater coincidence of partials. By this definition, consonance is dependent not only on the width of the interval between two notes (i.e., the musical tuning), but also on the combined spectral distribution and thus sound quality (i.e., the timbre) of the notes (see Critical band). Thus, a note and the note one octave higher are highly consonant because the partials of the higher note are also partials of the lower note.
Dynamic Tonality: Like "Coincidence of partials" above, Dynamic Tonality considers consonance to arise from the alignment of partials with notes (as per the video at right; see also Dynamic timbres).  Dynamic Tonality explicitly generalizes the relationship between the Harmonic series and Just intonation to embrace pseudo-harmonic timbres played in related pseudo-just tunings. As a result, Dynamic Tonality enables any musical interval to be made more or less consonant or dissonant in real time (i.e., during composition and/or performance) by controlling the degree to which the partials of the pseudo-harmonic timbre align with the interval's notes in the related pseudo-just tuning. For example, listen to C2ShiningC, which uses a timbre progression and a tuning progression to make the intervals within a single chord more or less consonant.

Music theory
Consonances may include:
Perfect consonances:
unisons and octaves
perfect fourths and perfect fifths
Imperfect consonances:
major seconds and minor sevenths
major thirds and minor sixths
minor thirds and major sixths

Dissonances may include:
Perfect dissonances:
tritones
minor seconds and major sevenths

Physiological basis

Two notes played simultaneously but with slightly different frequencies produce a beating "wah-wah-wah" sound. This phenomenon is used to create the Voix céleste stop in organs. Other musical styles such as Bosnian ganga singing, pieces exploring the buzzing sound of the Indian tambura drone, stylized improvisations on the Middle Eastern mijwiz, or Indonesian gamelan consider this sound an attractive part of the musical timbre and go to great lengths to create instruments that produce this slight "roughness".

Sensory dissonance and its two perceptual manifestations (beating and roughness) are both closely related to a sound signal's amplitude fluctuations. Amplitude fluctuations describe variations in the maximum value (amplitude) of sound signals relative to a reference point and are the result of wave interference. The interference principle states that the combined amplitude of two or more vibrations (waves) at any given time may be larger (constructive interference) or smaller (destructive interference) than the amplitude of the individual vibrations (waves), depending on their phase relationship. In the case of two or more waves with different frequencies, their periodically changing phase relationship results in periodic alterations between constructive and destructive interference, giving rise to the phenomenon of amplitude fluctuations.

"Amplitude fluctuations can be placed in three overlapping perceptual categories related to the rate of fluctuation. Slow amplitude fluctuations (≈≤20 per second) are perceived as loudness fluctuations referred to as beating. As the rate of fluctuation is increased, the loudness appears constant, and the fluctuations are perceived as "fluttering" or roughness. As the amplitude fluctuation rate is increased further, the roughness reaches a maximum strength and then gradually diminishes until it disappears (≈≥75–150 fluctuations per second, depending on the frequency of the interfering tones).

Assuming the ear performs a frequency analysis on incoming signals, as indicated by Ohm's acoustic law, the above perceptual categories can be related directly to the bandwidth of the hypothetical analysis filters, For example, in the simplest case of amplitude fluctuations resulting from the addition of two sine signals with frequencies f1 and f2, the fluctuation rate is equal to the frequency difference between the two sines |f1-f2|, and the following statements represent the general consensus:

 If the fluctuation rate is smaller than the filter bandwidth, then a single tone is perceived either with fluctuating loudness (beating) or with roughness.
 If the fluctuation rate is larger than the filter bandwidth, then a complex tone is perceived, to which one or more pitches can be assigned but which, in general, exhibits no beating or roughness.

Along with amplitude fluctuation rate, the second most important signal parameter related to the perceptions of beating and roughness is the degree of a signal's amplitude fluctuation, that is, the level difference between peaks and valleys in a signal. The degree of amplitude fluctuation depends on the relative amplitudes of the components in the signal's spectrum, with interfering tones of equal amplitudes resulting in the highest fluctuation degree and therefore in the highest beating or roughness degree.

For fluctuation rates comparable to the auditory filter bandwidth, the degree, rate, and shape of a complex signal's amplitude fluctuations are variables that are manipulated by musicians of various cultures to exploit the beating and roughness sensations, making amplitude fluctuation a significant expressive tool in the production of musical sound. Otherwise, when there is no pronounced beating or roughness, the degree, rate, and shape of a complex signal's amplitude fluctuations remain important, through their interaction with the signal's spectral components. This interaction is manifested perceptually in terms of pitch or timbre variations, linked to the introduction of combination tones.

"The beating and roughness sensations associated with certain complex signals are therefore usually understood in terms of sine-component interaction within the same frequency band of the hypothesized auditory filter, called critical band."

Frequency ratios: When harmonic timbres are played in a Just intonation (or a sufficiently close approximation thereof), ratios of higher simple numbers are more dissonant than lower ones. However, the farther the timbre departs from the harmonic series, and/or the farther than the tuning departs from a Just Intonation, the less the "frequency ratio" rule applies.

In human hearing, the varying effect of simple ratios may be perceived by one of these mechanisms:

Fusion or pattern matching: fundamentals may be perceived through pattern matching of the separately analyzed partials to a best-fit exact-harmonic template,( or the best-fit subharmonic, or harmonics may be perceptually fused into one entity, with dissonances being those intervals less likely mistaken for unisons, the imperfect intervals, because of the multiple estimates, at perfect intervals, of fundamentals, for one harmonic tone. By these definitions, inharmonic partials of otherwise harmonic spectra are usually processed separately, unless frequency or amplitude modulated coherently with the harmonic partials. For some of these definitions, neural firing supplies the data for pattern matching; see directly below.
Period length or neural-firing coincidence: with the length of periodic neural firing created by two or more waveforms, higher simple numbers creating longer periods or lesser coincidence of neural firing and thus dissonance. Purely harmonic tones cause neural firing exactly with the period or some multiple of the pure tone.
Dissonance is more generally defined by the amount of beating between partials (called harmonics or overtones when occurring in harmonic timbres),( Terhardt calls this "sensory dissonance". By this definition, dissonance is dependent not only on the width of the interval between two notes' fundamental frequencies, but also on the widths of the intervals between the two notes' non-fundamental partials. Sensory dissonance (i.e., presence of beating or roughness in a sound) is associated with the inner ear's inability to fully resolve spectral components with excitation patterns whose critical bands overlap. If two pure sine waves, without harmonics, are played together, people tend to perceive maximum dissonance when the frequencies are within the critical band for those frequencies, which is as wide as a minor third for low frequencies and as narrow as a minor second for high frequencies (relative to the range of human hearing). If harmonic tones with larger intervals are played, the perceived dissonance is due, at least in part, to the presence of intervals between the harmonics of the two notes that fall within the critical band. The sensory consonance or dissonance of any given interval, in any given tuning, can be adjusted by adjusting the partials in the timbre to be maximally aligned or mis-alinged, respectively, with the notes of the related tuning.
Dissonance sensation is a result of brain's response to unusual or rare sound perceptions. The brain is remembering and ranking the sound patterns that usually enters the ears, and if an unusual (rare occurring) sound is listened to, a well known EEG pattern emerges (P300/P3b) indicating an oddball event. This causes slight stress in the listener, which is causing the sensation of dissonance. In the same paper, Pankovski and Pankovska show by a software simulated neural network that the brain is capable of such remembering and ranking of the sound patterns, thus perfectly reproducing the well known Helmholtz's list of two-tone intervals ordered by consonance/dissonance, for the first time in the history of studying these phenomena. As a consequence, Pankovski and Pankovska suggest that the consonance and dissonance are biologically dependent for the more consonant sounds, and culturally dependent for the more dissonant sounds.

Generally, the sonance (i.e., a continuum with pure consonance at one end and pure dissonance at the other) of any given interval can be controlled by adjusting the timbre in which it is played, thereby aligning its partials with the current tuning's notes (or vice versa). The sonance of the interval between two notes can be maximized (producing consonance) by maximizing the alignment of the two notes' partials, whereas it can be minimized (producing dissonance) by mis-aligning each otherwise nearly aligned pair of partials by an amount equal to the width of the critical band at the average of the two partials' frequencies.(

Controlling the sonance of pseudo-harmonic timbres played in pseudo-just tunings in real time is an aspect of dynamic tonality. For example, in William Sethares' piece C to Shining C] (discussed at ), the sonance of intervals is affected both by tuning progressions and timbre progressions, introducing tension and release into the playing of a single chord.

The strongest homophonic (harmonic) cadence, the authentic cadence, dominant to tonic (D-T, V-I or V7-I), is in part created by the dissonant tritone created by the seventh, also dissonant, in the dominant seventh chord, which precedes the tonic.

Instruments producing non-harmonic overtone series
Musical instruments like bells and xylophones, called Idiophones, are played such that their relatively stiff, non-trivial mass is excited to vibration by means of a blow. This contrasts with violins, flutes, or drums, where the vibrating medium is a light, supple string, column of air, or membrane. The overtones of the inharmonic series produced by such instruments may differ greatly from that of the rest of the orchestra, and the consonance or dissonance of the harmonic intervals as well.

According to John Gouwens, the carillon's harmony profile is summarized:
 Consonant: minor third, tritone, minor sixth, perfect fourth, perfect fifth, and possibly minor seventh or even major second
 Dissonant: major third, major sixth
 Variable upon individual instrument: major seventh
Interval inversion does not apply.

In history of Western music

Dissonance has been understood and heard differently in different musical traditions, cultures, styles, and time periods. Relaxation and tension have been used as analogy since the time of Aristotle till the present.

The terms dissonance and consonance are often considered equivalent to tension and relaxation. A cadence is (among other things) a place where tension is resolved; hence the long tradition of thinking of a musical phrase as consisting of a cadence and a passage of gradually accumulating tension leading up to it.

Various psychological principles constructed through the audience's general conception of tonal fluidity determine how a listener will distinguish an instance of dissonance within a musical composition. Based on one's developed conception of the general tonal fusion within the piece, an unexpected tone played sightly variant to the overall schema will generate a psychological need for resolve. When the consonant is followed thereafter, the listener will encounter a sense of resolution. Within Western music, these particular instances and psychological effects within a composition have come to possess an ornate connotation.

The application of consonance and dissonance "is sometimes regarded as a property of isolated sonorities that is independent of what precedes or follows them. In most Western music, however, dissonances are held to resolve onto following consonances, and the principle of resolution is tacitly considered integral to consonance and dissonance".

Antiquity and the middle ages 
In Ancient Greece, armonia denoted the production of a unified complex, particularly one expressible in numerical ratios. Applied to music, the concept concerned how sounds in a scale or a melody fit together (in this sense, it could also concern the tuning of a scale). The term symphonos was used by Aristoxenus and others to describe the intervals of the fourth, the fifth, the octave and their doublings; other intervals were said diaphonos. This terminology probably referred to the Pythagorean tuning, where fourths, fifths and octaves (ratios 4:3, 3:2 and 2:1) were directly tunable, while the other scale degrees (other 3-prime ratios) could only be tuned by combinations of the preceding. Until the advent of polyphony and even later, this remained the basis of the concept of consonance versus dissonance (symphonia versus diaphonia) in Western music theory.

In the early Middle Ages, the Latin term  translated either armonia or symphonia. Boethius (6th century) characterizes consonance by its sweetness, dissonance by its harshness: "Consonance is the blending of a high sound with a low one, sweetly and uniformly arriving to the ears. Dissonance is the harsh and unhappy percussion of two sounds mixed together". It remains unclear, however, whether this could refer to simultaneous sounds. The case becomes clear, however, with Hucbald of Saint Amand (c. 900), who writes: "Consonance is the measured and concordant blending of two sounds, which will come about only when two simultaneous sounds from different sources combine into a single musical whole ... There are six of these consonances, three simple and three composite, ... octave, fifth, fourth, and octave-plus-fifth, octave-plus-fourth and double octave".

According to Johannes de Garlandia:
Perfect consonance: unisons and octaves. ( — "[Consonance] is said perfect, when two voices are joined at the same time, so that the one, by audition, cannot be distinguished from the other because of the concordance, and it is called equisonance, as in unison and octave.")
Median consonance: fourths and fifths. ( — "Consonances are said median, when two voices are joined at the same time, which neither can be said perfect, nor imperfect, but which partly agree with the perfect, and partly with the imperfect. And they are of two species, namely the fifth and the fourth.")
Imperfect consonance: minor and major thirds. (Imperfect consonances are not formally mentioned in the treatise, but the quotation above concerning median consonances does refer to imperfect consonances, and the section on consonances concludes:  — "So it appears that there are six species of consonances, that is: unison, octave, fifth, fourth, minor third, major third." The last two appear as imperfect consonances by elimination.)
Imperfect dissonance: major sixth (tone + fifth) and minor seventh (minor third + fifth). ( — [Dissonances] are said imperfect, when two voices are joined so that by audition although they can to some extent match, nevertheless they do not concord. And there are two species, namely tone plus fifth and minor third plus fifth.")
Median dissonance: tone and minor sixth (semitone + fifth). ( — [Dissonances] are said median when two voices are joined so that they partly match the perfect, partly the imperfect. And they are of two species, namely tone and semitone plus fifth.")
Perfect dissonance: semitone, tritone, major seventh (major third + fifth). (Here again, the perfect dissonances can only be deduced by elimination from this phrase:  — These species of dissonances are seven: semitone, tritone, major third plus fifth; tone plus fifth, minor third plus fifth; tone and semitone plus fifth.")

One example of imperfect consonances previously considered dissonances in Guillaume de Machaut's "Je ne cuit pas qu'onques":

According to Margo Schulter:

Stable:
Purely blending: unisons and octaves
Optimally blending: fourths and fifths

Unstable:
Relatively blending: minor and major thirds
Relatively tense: major seconds, minor sevenths, and major sixths
Strongly discordant: minor seconds, tritonus, and major sevenths, and often minor sixths

It is worth noting that "perfect" and "imperfect" and the notion of being must be taken in their contemporaneous Latin meanings (perfectum , imperfectum ) to understand these terms, such that imperfect is "unfinished" or "incomplete" and thus an imperfect dissonance is "not quite manifestly dissonant" and perfect consonance is "done almost to the point of excess". Also, inversion of intervals (major second in some sense equivalent to minor seventh) and octave reduction (minor ninth in some sense equivalent to minor second) were yet unknown during the Middle Ages.

Due to the different tuning systems compared to modern times, the minor seventh and major ninth were "harmonic consonances", meaning that they correctly reproduced the interval ratios of the harmonic series which softened a bad effect. They were also often filled in by pairs of perfect fourths and perfect fifths respectively, forming resonant (blending) units characteristic of the musics of the time, where "resonance" forms a complementary trine with the categories of consonance and dissonance. Conversely, the thirds and sixths were tempered severely from pure ratios, and in practice usually treated as dissonances in the sense that they had to resolve to form complete perfect cadences and stable sonorities.

The salient differences from modern conception:
parallel fourths and fifths were acceptable and necessary, open fourths and fifths inside octaves were the characteristic stable sonority in 3 or more voices,
minor sevenths and major ninths were fully structural,
tritones—as a deponent sort of fourth or fifth—were sometimes stacked with perfect fourths and fifths,
thirds and sixths (and tall stacks thereof) were not the sort of intervals upon which stable harmonies were based,
final cadential consonances of fourth, fifths, and octaves need not be the target of "resolution" on a beat-to-beat (or similar) time basis: minor sevenths and major ninths may move to octaves forthwith, or sixths to fifths (or minor sevenths), but the fourths and fifths within might become "dissonant" 5/3, 6/3, or 6/4 chordioids, continuing the succession of non-consonant sonorities for timespans limited only by the next cadence.

Renaissance
In Renaissance music, the perfect fourth above the bass was considered a dissonance needing immediate resolution. The regola delle terze e seste ("rule of thirds and sixths") required that imperfect consonances should resolve to a perfect one by a half-step progression in one voice and a whole-step progression in another. The viewpoint concerning successions of imperfect consonances—perhaps more concerned by a desire to avoid monotony than by their dissonant or consonant character—has been variable. Anonymous XIII (13th century) allowed two or three, Johannes de Garlandia's Optima introductio (13th–14th century) three, four or more, and Anonymous XI (15th century) four or five successive imperfect consonances. Adam von Fulda wrote "Although the ancients formerly would forbid all sequences of more than three or four imperfect consonances, we more modern do not prohibit them."

Common practice period
In the common practice period, musical style required preparation for all dissonances, followed by a resolution to a consonance. There was also a distinction between melodic and harmonic dissonance. Dissonant melodic intervals included the tritone and all augmented and diminished intervals. Dissonant harmonic intervals included:

Minor second and major seventh
Augmented fourth and diminished fifth (enharmonically equivalent, tritone)

Early in history, only intervals low in the overtone series were considered consonant. As time progressed, intervals ever higher on the overtone series were considered as such. The final result of this was the so-called "emancipation of the dissonance" by some 20th-century composers. Early-20th-century American composer Henry Cowell viewed tone clusters as the use of higher and higher overtones.

Composers in the Baroque era were well aware of the expressive potential of dissonance:

Bach uses dissonance to communicate religious ideas in his sacred cantatas and Passion settings. At the end of the St Matthew Passion, where the agony of Christ's betrayal and crucifixion is portrayed, John Eliot Gardiner hears that "a final reminder of this comes in the unexpected and almost excruciating dissonance Bach inserts over the very last chord: the melody instruments insist on B natural—the jarring leading tone—before eventually melting in a C minor cadence."

In the opening aria of Cantata BWV 54, Widerstehe doch der Sünde ("upon sin oppose resistance"), nearly every strong beat carries a dissonance:

Albert Schweitzer says that this aria "begins with an alarming chord of the seventh... It is meant to depict the horror of the curse upon sin that is threatened in the text". Gillies Whittaker points out that "The thirty-two continuo quavers of the initial four bars support four consonances only, all the rest are dissonances, twelve of them being chords containing five different notes. It is a remarkable picture of desperate and unflinching resistance to the Christian to the fell powers of evil."

According to H. C. Robbins Landon, the opening movement of Haydn's Symphony No. 82, "a brilliant C major work in the best tradition" contains "dissonances of barbaric strength that are succeeded by delicate passages of Mozartean grace":

Mozart's music contains a number of quite radical experiments in dissonance. The following comes from his Adagio and Fugue in C minor, K. 546:

Mozart's Quartet in C major, K465 opens with an adagio introduction that gave the work its nickname, the "Dissonance Quartet":

There are several passing dissonances in this adagio passage, for example on the first beat of bar 3. However the most striking effect here is implied, rather than sounded explicitly. The A flat in the first bar is contradicted by the high A natural in the second bar, but these notes do not sound together as a discord. (See also False relation.)

An even more famous example from Mozart comes in a magical passage from the slow movement of his popular "Elvira Madigan" Piano Concerto 21, K467, where the subtle, but quite explicit dissonances on the first beats of each bar are enhanced by exquisite orchestration:

Philip Radcliffe speaks of this as “a remarkably poignant passage with surprisingly sharp dissonances." Radcliffe says that the dissonances here "have a vivid foretaste of Schumann and the way they gently melt into the major key is equally prophetic of Schubert." Eric Blom says that this movement must have "made Mozart's hearers sit up by its daring modernities... There is a suppressed feeling of discomfort about it."

The finale of Beethoven's Symphony No. 9 opens with a startling discord, consisting of a B flat inserted into a D minor chord:

Roger Scruton alludes to Wagner's description of this chord as introducing "a huge Schreckensfanfare—horror fanfare." When this passage returns later in the same movement (just before the voices enter) the sound is further complicated with the addition of a diminished seventh chord, creating, in Scruton's words "the most atrocious dissonance that Beethoven ever wrote, a first inversion D-minor triad containing all the notes of the D minor harmonic scale":

Robert Schumann's song "Auf einer Burg" from his cycle Liederkreis, Op. 39, climaxes on a striking dissonance in the fourteenth bar. As Nicholas Cook points out, this is "the only chord in the whole song that Schumann marks with an accent". Cook goes on to stress that what makes this chord so effective is Schumann's placing of it in its musical context: "in what leads up to it and what comes of it". Cook explains further how the interweaving of lines in both piano and voice parts in the bars leading up to this chord (bars 9–14) "are set on a kind of collision course; hence the feeling of tension rising steadily to a breaking point".

Wagner made increasing use of dissonance for dramatic effect as his style developed, particularly in his later operas. In the scene known as "Hagen's Watch" from the first act of Götterdämmerung, according to Scruton the music conveys a sense of "matchless brooding evil", and the excruciating dissonance in bars 9–10 below it constitute "a semitonal wail of desolation".

Another example of a cumulative build-up of dissonance from the early 20th century (1910) can be found in the Adagio that opens Gustav Mahler's unfinished 10th Symphony:

Richard Taruskin parsed this chord (in bars 206 and 208) as a "diminished nineteenth ... a searingly dissonant dominant harmony containing nine different pitches. Who knows what Guido Adler, for whom the second and Third Symphonies already contained 'unprecedented cacophonies', might have called it?"

One example of modernist dissonance comes from a work that received its first performance in 1913, three years after the Mahler:

The West's progressive embrace of increasingly dissonant intervals occurred almost entirely within the context of harmonic timbres, as produced by vibrating strings and columns of air, on which the West's dominant musical instruments are based. By generalizing Helmholtz's notion of consonance (described above as the "coincidence of partials") to embrace non-harmonic timbres and their related tunings, consonance has recently been "emancipated" from harmonic timbres and their related tunings. Using electronically controlled pseudo-harmonic timbres, rather than strictly harmonic acoustic timbres, provides tonality with new structural resources such as dynamic tonality. These new resources provide musicians with an alternative to pursuing the musical uses of ever-higher partials of harmonic timbres and, in some people's minds, may resolve what Arnold Schoenberg described as the "crisis of tonality".(

Neo-classic harmonic consonance theory

George Russell, in his 1953 Lydian Chromatic Concept of Tonal Organization, presents a slightly different view from classical practice, one widely taken up in Jazz. He regards the tritone over the tonic as a rather consonant interval due to its derivation from the Lydian dominant thirteenth chord.

In effect, he returns to a Medieval consideration of "harmonic consonance": that intervals when not subject to octave equivalence (at least not by contraction) and correctly reproducing the mathematical ratios of the harmonic series are truly non-dissonant. Thus the harmonic minor seventh, natural major ninth, half-sharp (quarter tone) eleventh note (untempered tritone), half-flat thirteenth note, and half-flat fifteenth note must necessarily be consonant.

Most of these pitches exist only in a universe of microtones smaller than a halfstep; notice also that we already freely take the flat (minor) seventh note for the just seventh of the harmonic series in chords. Russell extends by approximation the virtual merits of harmonic consonance to the 12TET tuning system of Jazz and the 12-note octave of the piano, granting consonance to the sharp eleventh note (approximating the harmonic eleventh), that accidental being the sole pitch difference between the major scale and the Lydian mode.

(In another sense, that Lydian scale representing the provenance of the tonic chord (with major seventh and sharp fourth) replaces or supplements the Mixolydian scale of the dominant chord (with minor seventh and natural fourth) as the source from which to derive extended tertian harmony.)

Dan Haerle, in his 1980 The Jazz Language, extends the same idea of harmonic consonance and intact octave displacement to alter Paul Hindemith's Series 2 gradation table from The Craft of Musical Composition. In contradistinction to Hindemith, whose scale of consonance and dissonance is currently the de facto standard, Haerle places the minor ninth as the most dissonant interval of all, more dissonant than the minor second to which it was once considered by all as octave-equivalent. He also promotes the tritone from most-dissonant position to one just a little less consonant than the perfect fourth and perfect fifth.

For context: unstated in these theories is that musicians of the Romantic Era had effectively promoted the major ninth and minor seventh to a legitimacy of harmonic consonance as well, in their fabrics of 4-note chords.

21st century 
Dynamic tonality offers a new perspective on consonance and dissonance by enabling a pseudo-just tuning and a pseudo-harmonic timbre to remain related despite real-time systematic changes to tuning, to timbre, or to both. This enables any musical interval in said tuning to be made more or less consonant in real time by aligning, more or less, the partials of said timbre with the notes of said tuning (or vice versa).

See also
Chord factor
Dissonant counterpoint
Limit (music)
Phonaesthetics

References

Sources

 

 

.

Further reading

 Anon. (1826). [Untitled]. The Harmonicon: A Journal of Music 4:
 Burns, Edward M. (1999). "Intervals, Scales, and Tuning", in The Psychology of Music second edition. Deutsch, Diana, ed. San Diego: Academic Press. .
 Eigeldinger, Jean-Jacques, Roy Howat, and Naomi Shohet. 1988. Chopin: Pianist and Teacher: As Seen by His Pupils. Cambridge and New York: Cambridge University Press. .
 Jonas, Oswald (1982). Introduction to the Theory of Heinrich Schenker: The Nature of the Musical Work of Art, translated by John Rothgeb. New York: Longman; London: Collier-Macmillan. . [Translated from Einführung in die Lehre Heinrich Schenkers, das Wesen des musikalischen Kunstwerkes, second edition. Vienna: Universal Edition, 1972. First edition as Das Wesen des musikalischen Kunstwerks: Eine Einführung in die Lehre Heinrich Schenkers. Vienna: Saturn-Verlag, 1934.]
 Kempers, Karel Philippus Bernet, and M. G. Bakker. 1949. Italian Opera, from the Dutch by M. M. Kessler-Button. Symphonia Books. Stockholm: Continental Book Co.
 Jeppesen, Knud (1946). The Style of Palestrina and the Dissonance, second revised and enlarged edition, translated by Margaret Hamerik with linguistic alterations and additions by Annie I. Fausboll. Copenhagen: E. Munksgaard; Oxford: Oxford University Press. Reprinted, with corrections, New York: Dover Publications, 1970. .
 Rice, Timothy (2004). Music in Bulgaria. Oxford and New York: Oxford University Press. .
 Sethares, William A. (1993). "Local Consonance and the Relationship between Timbre and Scale". Journal of the Acoustical Society of America, 94(1): 1218. (A non-technical version of the article)

External links

Atlas of Consonance
Octave Frequency Sweep, Consonance/Dissonance
Consonance and Dissonance—Index to Notes by David Huron at Ohio State University School of Music
Bibliography of Consonance and Dissonance
The Keyboard Tuning of Domenico Scarlatti
index of Dissonance for any musical scales in LucyTuning and meantone-type tunings

 
Music psychology